Ronald Pognon (born 16 November 1982) is a French sprint athlete. He originally specialized in the 200 metres, but later shifted to the shorter sprint distances. He was formerly the European record holder for the 60 metres indoors  and is the first Frenchman to go under 10 seconds at the 100 metres.

Early career
As a junior athlete he participated at the 2000 World Junior Championships, winning a silver medal in the 4 x 100 metres relay. He also competed individually in the 200 metres, without reaching the final. His personal best 200 m result at that time was 21.25 seconds, whereas his personal best 100 m result was 10.50 seconds. Two years later he had improved to 20.65 and 10.24 seconds respectively, and reached the 200 m semifinals at the 2002 European Championships. At the 2002 European Championships he also finished fourth in 4 × 100 m relay with teammates David Patros, Issa-Aimé Nthépé and Jérôme Éyana.

He then shifted focus to the 100 metres. He reached the semifinals in this event at both the 2003 World Championships and the 2004 Olympic Games. At the Olympics he also competed in the relay, but failed to reach the final with the French team. He lowered his personal best time to 10.13 seconds in 2003 and 10.11 in 2004, both times in the town Castres.

Breakthrough
In 2005 he started the season by setting a French indoor record in the 60 metres, with 6.45 seconds on 2 March in Karlsruhe. He won the silver medal in the same event at the 2005 European Indoor Championships.

He competed at the 2005 World Championships in both 100 and 200 metres, but did not reach the final; however, in the 4 × 100 m relay he won a gold medal together with teammates Ladji Doucouré, Eddy De Lépine and Lueyi Dovy. He rounded off the season by finishing fifth in the 2005 World Athletics Final. He also set personal best times in both 100 and 200 metres that season. 9.99 seconds in the Lausanne Super Grand Prix in July, and 20.27 seconds in the Rieti Grand Prix in August. He became the first Frenchman to go under 10 seconds, and only four Europeans had run faster: Francis Obikwelu (9.86), Linford Christie (9.87), Dwain Chambers (9.97) and Jason Gardener (9.98).

In 2006 he finished sixth at the 2006 World Indoor Championships, fourth at the 2006 European Championships and sixth at the 2006 World Athletics Final, the latter in a season's best time of 10.10 seconds. At the European Championships he helped win a bronze medal in the relay, behind Great Britain and Poland, together with an entirely new team: Oudéré Kankarafou, Pognon, Fabrice Calligny and David Alerte. At the end of the season, Pognon was selected for the 2006 World Cup, finishing fifth in the 100 metres.

Later career

The 2007 season saw Pognon win a bronze medal in 60 metres at the 2007 European Indoor Championships. He had run the 60 metres in 6.55 seconds, better than the year before. However, during the outdoor season he did not compete. He returned to competition in 2008, running only 6.68 in the 60 m indoors but managing 10.13 seconds in July in Rethimno to qualify for the Olympic Games in Beijing. Competing in the 100 metres event, he placed third in his heat behind Tyrone Edgar and Darvis Patton in a time of 10.26 seconds. He qualified for the second round in which he improved his time to 10.21 seconds; however, he was unable to qualify for the semifinals as he finished in fourth place. He did not participate in the 4 × 100 m relay, although France did field a team.

At the 2012 Summer Olympics, he was part of the French 4 × 100 m relay team that went on to finish 3rd in the final, winning the bronze medal.

Statistics
As of April 2, 2014

Personal bests

All information from IAAF Profile

References

1982 births
Living people
People from Le Lamentin
French male sprinters
Athletes (track and field) at the 2004 Summer Olympics
Athletes (track and field) at the 2008 Summer Olympics
Athletes (track and field) at the 2012 Summer Olympics
Olympic athletes of France
Olympic bronze medalists for France
Medalists at the 2012 Summer Olympics
Martiniquais athletes
French people of Martiniquais descent
World Athletics Championships medalists
European Athletics Championships medalists
Olympic bronze medalists in athletics (track and field)
World Athletics Championships winners